Carl Arp (3 January 1867 – 6 January 1913) was a German landscape painter. He is best known as a founding member of the Schleswig-Holsteinische Kunstgenossenschaft and representative of the Weimar Saxon-Grand Ducal Art School (Grossherzoglich-Sächsische Kunstschule Weimar). Subsequent to his studies there under Theodor Hagen and Leopold von Kalckreuth, he spent several years in Italy. Carl Arp is viewed as one of the main representatives of the "en plein air" style of landscape painting.

Arp was born in Kiel, where he taught in Kiel; he also taught in Weimar, and had exhibitions in Munich, Berlin and Düsseldorf. His works are exhibited in museums in Kiel, Danzig und Weimar. During the second world war, the SS Cap Tafelneh, sunk by German planes at Dunkirk and salvaged by the German navy, was named after him.

Arp's works are mostly oil or water colour paintings with motives from Schleswig-Holstein and the Kieler Förde, as well as his time in southern Germany and Italy.
Examples include:
 An den Schleusen / At the Sluice Gates, oil on board, 75 cm x 54 cm
 Giardino Pubblico, Venedig / Public Gardens, Venice, oil on board, 31 cm x 24 cm
 Matterhorn / Monte Cervino, oil on board, 16.5 cm x 21.5 cm

See also
 List of German painters

References

External links
The Weimar School @ Ketterer Kunst

1867 births
1913 deaths
19th-century German painters
German male painters
20th-century German painters
20th-century German male artists
German landscape painters
19th-century German male artists